Sophie Belinda Jonas (née Turner; born 21 February 1996) is an English actress. She made her acting debut as Sansa Stark on the HBO epic fantasy television series Game of Thrones (2011–2019), for which she received a Primetime Emmy Award nomination for the Outstanding Supporting Actress in a Drama Series in 2019.

Turner appeared in the television film The Thirteenth Tale (2013) and made her feature film debut in Another Me (2013). She appeared in the action comedy Barely Lethal (2015) and portrayed a young Jean Grey / Phoenix in the X-Men film series (2016–2019).

Early life
Sophie Belinda Turner was born in Northampton, England on 21 February 1996, the daughter of Sally, a nursery school teacher, and Andrew, who works for a pallet distribution company. She moved to Chesterton, Warwickshire when she was 2 years old. She attended Warwick Prep School until she was 11, and later attended the independent The King's High School for Girls. Turner has been a member of the Playbox Theatre Company since she was 3 years old. She has two older brothers. Her twin died in utero.

She grew up in a large Edwardian house, near Leamington Spa, saying, "My childhood was pretty fun. We had pigsties, barns and a paddock, and used to muck around in the mud." Turner had a tutor on the set of Game of Thrones until age 16. She achieved five GCSE A-grades and four Bs, including a B in Drama.

Career
Turner was cast as Sansa Stark, a young noblewoman, in the HBO fantasy drama series Game of Thrones in August 2009. Filming began in July 2010, when Turner was 14 years old. Sansa was Turner's first television role. Turner's drama teacher encouraged her to audition for the part, and she dyed her blonde hair auburn for the role, although in Season 7 she began wearing wigs. In 2012, she was nominated for the Young Artist Award for Best Performance in a TV Series – Supporting Young Actress for her performance as Sansa, alongside her on-screen sister, Maisie Williams. Turner appeared in all eight broadcast seasons.

In 2013, she had her first movie role as the lead character in the independent thriller film Another Me, based on the novel of the same name by Catherine MacPhail. She starred as Adeline March in the 2013 television film The Thirteenth Tale.
In 2013, she was cast in the comedy film Barely Lethal, alongside Hailee Steinfeld, which was released on 29 May 2015 in a limited release and through video on demand. Turner also narrated the audiobook version of the Lev Grossman short story "The Girl in the Mirror", which was included in the short fiction anthology Dangerous Women and was edited by George R. R. Martin. In 2014, she narrated the audiobook City of Heavenly Fire by Cassandra Clare. The same year, she was the face of Karen Millen's "The Journey" campaign. Turner played mutant Jean Grey in X-Men: Apocalypse, which was released in May 2016 to mixed critical success.

During summer 2016, she hosted the web video Powershift in partnership with the Huffington Post. In March 2017, she announced she had become patron of Women for Women, an organisation that supports female war survivors. In August 2017, Turner said she believed her social media following was responsible for her successful casting in an unnamed project rather than her abilities as an actress, saying, "[I]t was between me and another girl who is a far better actress than I am, far better, but I had the followers, so I got the job." In June 2017, she began a collaboration with Wella Hair, becoming its first international brand ambassador.

In November 2017, Turner was cast to play Juliane Koepcke in the movie Girl Who Fell From the Sky. She is also attached to produce the movie. In March and April 2018, she filmed the independent film Heavy in Toronto, Ontario, Canada. Turner reprised her role as Jean Grey in the X-Men film Dark Phoenix, which takes place in 1992 and follows the events of Apocalypse. The film was released in June 2019.

She has been featured in print work for the luxury designer brand Louis Vuitton.

In September 2019, Turner was cast in the thriller television show Survive.

Personal life
Turner started dating American singer Joe Jonas in 2016. They became engaged in October 2017. They were married on 1 May 2019 in Las Vegas, Nevada. Following her marriage, Turner legally changed her last name to Jonas; the couple reside in New York City. They held a second wedding ceremony in Carpentras, France on 29 June 2019. The couple have two daughters, born in July 2020 and July 2022.

Turner was the inspiration behind the song "Hesitate", which was written as a love letter to her by Jonas, for the Jonas Brothers reunion album, Happiness Begins.

Filmography

Film

Television

Music videos

Awards and nominations

References

External links 

 
 

Living people
1996 births
21st-century English actresses
Actors from Northamptonshire
Actresses from Warwickshire
Audiobook narrators
English child actresses
English expatriates in the United States
English film actresses
English stage actresses
English television actresses
English voice actresses
Jonas family
People educated at The King's High School for Girls
People from Northampton
People from Stratford-on-Avon District